Ivan Matveyev (10 February 1914 – 5 July 1984) was a Soviet sailor. He competed at the 1952 Summer Olympics and the 1956 Summer Olympics.

References

External links
 

1914 births
1984 deaths
Soviet male sailors (sport)
Olympic sailors of Belgium
Sailors at the 1952 Summer Olympics – Dragon
Sailors at the 1956 Summer Olympics – Dragon
Sportspeople from Saint Petersburg